Swadhyay may refer to:

 Svādhyāya (Devanagari: स्वाध्याय) is a Sanskrit term which literally means "one's own reading" and "self-study".
 The Swadhyay Parivar is a devotional movement based in Maharashtra, India.